Ani Nath Shahdeo was Nagvanshi king in 17th century. He was king of Barkagarh estate. He founded his capital at Satrangi near Subarnarekha river. He built Jagannath temple in 1691. He established Hat i.e. market at that place which is now known as Hatia.

Personal life and Family
He was son of king Ram Shah and Mukta Devi. He was younger brother of king Raghunath Shah. He married the daughter of king of Rewa.

References

Year of birth missing
Year of death missing
17th-century Indian monarchs
People from Ranchi district
Nagpuria people